The 2021 Girls' U16 European Volleyball Championship was the 3rd edition of the Girls' U16 European Volleyball Championship, a biennial international volleyball tournament organised by the European Volleyball Confederation (CEV) the girls' under-16 national teams of Europe. The tournament was held in Hungary and Slovakia from 10 to 18 July 2021.

Qualification

Venues

Pools composition
The drawing of lots was combined with a seeding of National Federations and performed as follows:
The two organisers were seeded in Preliminary pools. Hungary in Pool I and Slovakia in Pool II.
Remaining 10 participating teams drawn after they were previously placed in five cups as per their position in the latest European Ranking

Result
The drawing of lots was held on 11 May 2021 in Luxembourg.

Preliminary round

Pool I

|}

|}

Pool II

|}

|}

5th–8th classification

5th–8th semifinals

|}

7th-place match

|}

5th-place match

|}

Final round

Semifinals

|}

3rd-place match

|}

Final

|}

Final standing

Awards
At the conclusion of the tournament, the following players were selected as the tournament dream team.

Most Valuable Player
 Marina Asliamova
Best Setter
 Polina Sarapova
Best Outside Spikers
 Erika Esposito
 Polina Kovaleva

Best Middle Blockers
 Linda Manfredini
 Maia Carlotta Monaco
Best Opposite Spiker
 Iva Dudova
Best Libero
 Olesia Ananina

References

External links
Official website

Girls' Youth European Volleyball Championship
Europe
Volleyball
International volleyball competitions hosted by Hungary
International volleyball competitions hosted by Slovakia
European Volleyball Championship
European Volleyball Championship
European Volleyball Championship
European Volleyball Championship
European Volleyball Championship